Urban Legends: Bloody Mary (also known as Urban Legends 3: Bloody Mary or simply Urban Legend 3) is a 2005 American direct-to-video supernatural slasher film directed by Mary Lambert and starring Kate Mara, Robert Vito, Tina Lifford, Ed Marinaro and Lillith Fields as Bloody Mary. A sequel to Urban Legends: Final Cut (2000), it is the third installment in the Urban Legend film series. The film follows a high school student who inadvertently unleashes a long-dead spirit, and one by one, her friends begin to die.

Urban Legends: Bloody Mary was shot on location in Salt Lake City, Utah.

Released on July 19, 2005, it is the first film in the series to use supernatural elements other than a slasher formula.

Plot

In 1969, at the Worthington High Homecoming Dance, three high school footballers tried to drug and kidnap their dates. Their plan works with two girls, but the third, Mary Banner, tries to escape. The football captain chases her into a storage room and punches her, knocking her out. Unable to revive her nor hear her heartbeat, he believes Mary to be dead. Panicking, he locks her body in an old trunk.

Thirty-five years later, in 2004, three teenagers, Samantha (Sam), Mindy and Natalie, jokingly conjure up Bloody Mary during a sleepover, and the next morning all three are gone. After having been missing for one day, they reappear, waking up in an old deserted mill, with no knowledge of how they got there. While most suspect a hoax on the girls' part, Sam and her brother, David, suspect that it is a prank by their school's football players in retaliation for a school newspaper article written by Sam.

While visions of a dead girl bleeding from her head haunt Sam, several pupils die under mysterious circumstances resembling urban legends; football player Roger burns in a sunbed. Heather, the girlfriend of football captain Buck, has spiders erupt from her cheek, driving her to cut her face with a mirror. Football player, Tom, is electrocuted while urinating on an old electrical fence, his ring finger being bitten or cut off. Buck blames these deaths on the Owens siblings. Before her death, Heather made up with Sam and tried to tell her that this had happened before. In her homework, Sam finds notes sent to Heather about the disappearance of Mary Banner and the homecoming kidnappings of 1969. Browsing the school paper's archives, they find out that Mary was never found and is presumed dead, another victim committed suicide in 1982, and the third, Grace Taylor, still lives in town.

They visit Grace, who claims that Mary, or rather, her "life force", is exacting revenge on the children of the five people involved in the kidnappings but cannot (or will not) reveal the names of the perpetrators. While Sam is prone to believe her, David remains skeptical and thinks Grace is the killer. While sneaking around in Grace's house, he also found out that Grace produced or collected artwork on Urban Legends and identifies Grace as the originator of the notes sent to Heather. The siblings go to warn Buck, who admits that he and his mates orchestrated Samantha's disappearance and blames her for the death of his friends. He also reveals that his father, the football coach, was one of the kidnappers in 1969 but did not hurt Mary. Sam, however, suspects that the coach was the one that killed Mary as she saw him put flowers on her headstone earlier.

Meanwhile, an upset Buck tries to relax by drinking and watching a film in a motel. Falling asleep, he wakes up after hearing a dripping sound and discovers the corpse of his dog. A demonic Mary, who crawls out from under his bed, kills Buck with his broken whiskey bottle containing Tom's finger. Different rumours about his death spread immediately.

David visits Grace, who still refuses to reveal the names but directs him to the school archives. Going through the archives, he discovers the identity of the fifth person and rushes home, but finds Sam gone and is suffocated by a hooded figure. Meanwhile, Sam has visions of Mary again, revealing that the girl was not dead when she was locked in the trunk and that she later awoke, realizing she was buried alive. The visions also reveal to Sam the whereabouts of the trunk. Sam visits Grace, who tells her to find and bury Mary's corpse and reluctantly agrees to drive Sam to the school. While Grace is waiting in the van, Sam finds the storage room and the trunk with Mary's decayed corpse. The hooded figure also appears and enters the storage room but Sam locks him inside while carrying Mary's remains outside to the van.

Finding Grace unconscious, Sam drives the van to the cemetery, where she begins to dig a grave for Mary under her headstone. Her stepfather, whom Sam had phoned, also appears and helps her dig. He suddenly hits Sam with the shovel. Grace intervenes and tries to fight off Mr. Owens, whom Grace recognizes and calls by his name, but he eventually knocks Grace out. Pursuing his stepdaughter through the graveyard, Bill Owens reveals that he was the one that locked Mary in the trunk and that he also killed David. He finally captures her and is about to decapitate her with the shovel when Mary appears in her living form. Smiling towards Sam, she kisses Bill, then reverts to her ghostly form and drags him with her into the grave.

When Sam wakes up, the grave is surrounded by police and medical personnel retrieving her stepfather's corpse. She and Grace are bandaged and treated for their wounds, and they sit consoling one another.

Cast

Production
Production of the movie began on November 20, 2004.

Principal filming ended on December 16, 2004. The movie was shot in Salt Lake City, Utah.

Release

Home media
The film was released direct-to-video on July 19, 2005.

Reception

Critical response
On Rotten Tomatoes, the film has an approval rating of 40% with an average rating of 4.4 based on 5 reviews.
Felix Vasquez Jr. of Cinema Crazed gave the film a mixed review, writing, "'Bloody Mary' is not the worst movie on video store shelves as many people have claimed, but it's just not effective enough to ever be anything more than a simple horror movie about urban legends." Geoffrey D. Roberts of ReelTalk.com called the film, "a flat, one-note ripoff" and criticized its lack of scares.

See also
 Bloody Mary folklore in popular culture

References

External links
 
 

2005 films
2005 horror films
2000s slasher films
2000s supernatural horror films
American slasher films
American sequel films
American supernatural horror films
Direct-to-video horror films
Direct-to-video sequel films
Films about pranks
Films about proms
Films based on urban legends
Films directed by Mary Lambert
Films scored by Jeff Rona
Films set in 1969
Films set in 2004
Films shot in Salt Lake City
Films with screenplays by Michael Dougherty
Films with screenplays by Dan Harris (screenwriter)
Sony Pictures direct-to-video films
Supernatural slasher films
2005 direct-to-video films
2000s English-language films
2000s American films
Urban Legend (film series)